Diversity, diversify, or diverse may refer to:

Business
Diversity (business), the inclusion of people of different identities (ethnicity, gender, age) in the workforce
Diversity marketing, marketing communication targeting diverse customers
Supplier diversity, the use of diverse suppliers

Politics
 Diversity (politics), the political and social policy of encouraging tolerance for people of different cultural and racial backgrounds
 Diversity Immigrant Visa or Green Card Lottery, a United States immigration program
 Diversity jurisdiction, a concept under which U.S. federal courts can hear suits between parties from different states
 Diversity training, the process of educating people to function in a diverse environment
 Cultural diversity, the respect of different cultures and interculturality
 Functional diversity (disability), a term for special needs, disability, impairment and handicap
 Gerodiversity, a multicultural approach to issues of aging
 Multiculturalism, or ethnic diversity, the promotion of multiple ethnic cultures
 Neurodiversity, a movement in support of civil rights of people with atypical neurological characteristics

Science
 Diversity factor, a concept in electrical engineering
 Functional diversity, a term in geography
 Linguistic diversity
 Diversity (mathematics), a generalization of metric space

Biology
 Biodiversity, degree of variation of life forms within an ecosystem
 Crop diversity, the variance in genetic and phenotypic characteristics of plants used in agriculture
 Diversity index, a statistic to assess the diversity of a population
 Ecosystem diversity, the diversity of a place at the level of ecosystems
 Functional diversity (ecology), the elements of biodiversity that influence how ecosystems function
 Genetic diversity, the total number of genetic characteristics in the genetic makeup of a species
 Nucleotide diversity, a measure of the degree of polymorphism within a population
 Phylogenetic diversity, a measure of biodiversity which incorporates phylogenetic difference between species
 Species diversity, the effective number of species represented in a data set
 Diversity (journal), an academic journal published by MDPI

Technology
 Diversity combining, the combining of multiple received signals into a single improved signal
 Diversity gain, the increase in signal-to-interference ratio due to a diversity scheme
 Diversity scheme, a method for improving reliability of a message signal by using multiple communications channels
 Antenna diversity or space diversity, a method of wireless communication that use two or more antennas to improve reliability
 Cooperative diversity, a multiple antenna technique for improving or maximising total network channel capacities
 Site diversity, multiple receivers for satellite communication
 Time diversity, a technique used in digital communication systems
 Transmit diversity, wireless communication using signals originating from two or more independent sources

As a proper name

Music
Diversity (album), a 2010 reggae album by Gentleman
Diversity (dance troupe), an English dance troupe based in London
Diversity FM, a radio station in Lancaster, England
Diverse (rapper)
"Diverse", a song by Charlie Parker

Other
Diversity University, a virtual reality system for education

See also 

 Diversification (disambiguation)